The ocellated turbot (Pleuronichthys ocellatus) is a species of flatfish in the family Pleuronectidae. Its native habitat is the subtropical waters of the eastern Pacific, specifically southern Baja California (Magdalena Bay area) and the upper Gulf of California (northern Sinaloa); it is the only member of the genus to prefer subtropical waters.

References

ocellated turbot
Fauna of the Baja California Peninsula
Fish of the Gulf of California
ocellated turbot